The Faceless Voice (French: La voix sans visage) is a 1933 French drama film directed by Leo Mittler and starring Lucien Muratore, Véra Korène and Jean Servais.

Plot
The singer Saltore is accused of murdering his wife's lover and sentenced to hard labor for ten years.  He is proven innocent by his daughter when she discovers that his wife, who wanted to end an embarrassing affair, was the culprit.

Cast
 Lucien Muratore as Pierre Saltore  
 Véra Korène as Estelle  
 Jean Servais as Gérard  
 Simone Bourday as Jeanne  
 Georges Flamant as André Sourdois  
 Aimé Clariond as Maître Clément  
 Max Maxudian as Le président  
 Jean Gobet as Le domestique  
 Henry Darbray as L'autre domestique  
 Margo Lion as Une chanteuse  
 Madeleine Guitty as Une invitée 
 Odette Barencey 
 Sylvia Bataille 
 Véra Markels 
 Teddy Michaud

References

Bibliography 
 Dayna Oscherwitz & MaryEllen Higgins. The A to Z of French Cinema. Scarecrow Press, 2009.

External links 
 

1933 films
French drama films
1933 drama films
1930s French-language films
Films directed by Leo Mittler
Films scored by Michel Michelet
French black-and-white films
1930s French films